Drop 6 is an extended play by British rapper Little Simz. It was released on 6 May 2020 under AWAL.

Track listing
Track listing by Tidal

References

2020 EPs
Little Simz albums
AWAL EPs